The National Liberation Forces were an insurgent group in Mexico. It was founded in 1969 by a group of young regiomontanos led by César Yáñez Muñoz, integrating the members of an old dissolved organization called the Mexican Insurgent Army (EIM).

One of FLN's leaders was Rafael Guillén, who became a leader within the group's successor, the Zapatista National Liberation Army (EZLN).

History 
The National Liberation Forces were established in August 1969, the founders were mainly students of the University of Nuevo León. The group's activities were limited to the state of Chiapas. In 1972, FLN activists bought the El Chilar ranch in Ocosingo, which would secretly serve as the FLN base. In 1974, one of the partisans gave the Mexican Army information on the location of the FLN headquarters. In the same year, the army stormed El Chilar. Five FLN fighters and three soldiers were killed in the attack, while others were arrested and tortured. The storming of El Chilar led to the self-dissolution of the National Liberation Forces, who continued their agitation underground. According to newspapers, in mid-April 1974, the surviving group led by Cesar Germán was wiped out by the army in the jungle. In 1983, former FLN members participated in the formation of the Zapatista Army of National Liberation.

It was the only armed organization in the 1970s that did not commit kidnappings or robberies.

See also 
 Party of the Poor
 Liga Comunista 23 de Septiembre
 Popular Revolutionary Army
 People's Guerrilla Group

References

1969 establishments in Mexico
1974 disestablishments in Mexico
Military units and formations established in 1969
Military units and formations disestablished in 1974
Defunct communist militant groups
Far-left politics in Mexico
Guerrilla movements in Latin America
Left-wing militant groups in Mexico
Maoist organizations
Maoism in North America